The surname Lolo may refer to:
 Cecil Lolo (1988-2015), South African footballer
 Fatima Lolo (1891–1997), Nigerian singer
 Igor Lolo (born 1982), Ivorian former football player
 Jean Baptiste Lolo (1798-?), Hudson's Bay Company employee and interpreter in what is now Canada
 Patrick Lolo (born 1980), Congolese footballer